The wildlife of Western Sahara is composed of its flora and fauna. It has 40 species of mammals and 207 species of birds.

Fauna

Mammals

Birds

References

 
Western Sahara